Thomas Jordier (born 12 August 1994 in Noisy-le-Sec) is a French sprinter specialising in the 400 metres. He won two gold medals at the 2015 European U23 Championships.

His personal bests in the event are 45.37 seconds outdoor (2022 European Athletics Championship ) and 46.68 seconds indoors (Nantes 2014).

Competition record

References

1994 births
Living people
Sportspeople from Seine-Saint-Denis
Athletes from Paris
French male sprinters
World Athletics Championships athletes for France
Athletes (track and field) at the 2016 Summer Olympics
Olympic athletes of France
Athletes (track and field) at the 2020 Summer Olympics
20th-century French people
21st-century French people
European Athletics Championships medalists